For the Strength of Youth has several meanings within the Church of Jesus Christ of Latter-day Saints:

For the Strength of Youth (conference), conferences for the youth of the church.
For the Strength of Youth (magazine), a magazine for youth of the church.
"For the Strength of Youth" (pamphlet), a pamphlet given to youth of the church setting out the standards of the church.

Latter Day Saint terms